Peter Mann Ronald (5 November 1889 – 21 April 1953) was an English association footballer. During his career he played for Hebburn Argyle, Watford, Nottingham Forest and West Stanley, primarily as an inside right. Following his retirement as a player, he coached Watford between 1926 and 1946.

Career

Born in Newcastle upon Tyne, Ronald started his career at nearby Hebburn Argyle, before transferring to Watford in June 1914 for an undisclosed fee. Despite the outbreak of the First World War, the Southern League continued for the 1914–15 season. Ronald quickly established himself as a regular starter in Watford's team, making 36 appearances and scoring 9 goals as Watford secured the Southern League title. He did not play for the club during wartime league matches, but did return for the 1919–20 season, scoring 10 of Watford's 69 goals as they finished as runners up in the Southern League to Portsmouth on goal average. Ronald's third season at Watford coincided with their first in the newly formed Football League Third Division. On 28 August 1920, Ronald scored his team's opening goal in a 2–1 win over QPR at Loftus Road, thereby becoming the first man ever to score for Watford in the Football League.

At the end of the 1920–21 season, Ronald transferred to Nottingham Forest, for a fee of £500. After two seasons largely as a reserve player, he moved to West Stanley in 1923, before rejoining Watford the following year. After failing to make a first team appearance, Ronald retired as a player in 1925, remaining as a coach until the conclusion of the Second World War and resumption of peacetime football in 1946. He died in Watford seven years later, aged 63.

Honours

Southern League Division 1:
Winner: 1914–15
Runner up: 1919–20

References

External links
Nottingham Forest
Watford Football Club

1889 births
1953 deaths
Footballers from Newcastle upon Tyne
English footballers
English Football League players
Southern Football League players
Hebburn Argyle F.C. players
Watford F.C. players
Nottingham Forest F.C. players
West Stanley F.C. players
Watford F.C. non-playing staff
Association football forwards